Jared K. Carpenter (born in Richmond, Kentucky, April 26, 1977) is a Republican member of the Kentucky Senate representing District 34 since January 4, 2011. He is the Chairman of the Senate Banking & Insurance Committee. He also serves on the Agriculture, Transportation, and Natural Resources & Energy Committees. Away from Frankfort he is a businessman and farmer residing in Berea with his family.

Education
Carpenter earned his BA from Eastern Kentucky University where he was a member of the basketball team.

Elections
In 2022 he defeated Rhonda Goode in the Republican Primary with 6,086 votes (75.6%). He defeated his Democratic challenger, Susan Cintra with 24,140 votes (59.7%).
In 2018 he ran unopposed in the Republican Primary. He defeated his Democratic challenger, Susan Byrne Haddix with 28,145 votes (61.8%).
In 2014 he ran unopposed in the Republican Primary. He defeated his Democratic challenger, Michael Cope, in the general election with 22,932 votes (64.6%).
2010 When District 34 Senator Ed Worley retired and left the seat open, Carpenter won the three-way May 18, 2010, Republican Primary with 4,405 votes (37.9%) and won the three-way November 2, 2010, General election with 23,553 votes (64.9%) against Democratic nominee Lee Murphy and Evangelical Christian Party candidate Donald VanWinkle.

References

External links
Official page  at the Kentucky General Assembly

Jared Carpenter at Ballotpedia
Jared K. Carpenter at OpenSecrets

Living people
Eastern Kentucky University alumni
Republican Party Kentucky state senators
21st-century American politicians
1977 births